Finocchiaro (meaning "producer or seller of fennel") is an Italian surname. Notable people with the surname include:

Andrea Finocchiaro Aprile (1878–1964), Italian politician
Angela Finocchiaro (born 1955), Italian actress
Anna Finocchiaro (born 1955), Italian politician
Camillo Finocchiaro Aprile (1851–1916), Italian jurist and politician
Donatella Finocchiaro (born 1970), Italian actress
Fabio Finocchiaro (born 1939), Italian chess player
Francesco Paolo Finocchiaro (1868–1947), Sicilian painter
Giusella Finocchiaro (born 1964), Italian lawyer
Katelynn Finocchiaro (born 2008), Child prodigy
Lia Finocchiaro (born 1984), Australian politician
Tim Finocchiaro (born 1979), Australian rules footballer
Vincenzo Finocchiaro (born 1953), Italian swimmer

See also
Mickey Carroll (born Michael Finocchiaro; 1919–2009), American actor

References

Italian-language surnames
Occupational surnames
fr:Finocchiaro